The Hoofdklasse is the second highest league of amateur women's football in the Netherlands, and the third tier in general.

When the Hoofdklasse was created in 1973, the league was the top level league of the Netherlands, and the winner was named the national champion. After the 2006/07 season, the professional Eredivisie was established as the top level league which now plays out the championship.

There was no relegation and promotion between those two leagues.

In the 2011/12 season the Hoofdklasse became a third level league, as above it the Topklasse was created. The Hoffdklasse thus is the second highest amateur league and now promotes teams to the Topklasse.

Format
From 1973 to 1994, the Hoofdklasse was Championship Playoff between regional champions. Mostly consisting of 6 regional champions that would play each other once. The winner of the group becoming the champion of the Netherlands. Since the 1994-95 season the Hoofdklasse was played nationwide as a 12 team league.

The teams play each other 2 times over the course of the season.

The last two teams get relegated into the Eerste Klasse.

Current Teams (2018-19) 
Teams the play in the 2018-19 season.

Hoofdklasse champions

Until 2012, the Hoofdklasse was the first tier and its champions were champions of the Netherlands. Since 2012, the Hoofdklasse is a third level league and the winner is no longer the champion of the Netherlands.

1973–1990 
 1973/74:  VV Reutum
 1974/75:  Osdorp Amsterdam
 1975/76:  Blauw Wit Amsterdam
 1976/77:  RKSV Braakhuizen
 1977/78:  Sint Hubert
 1978/79:  Alkmania Roelofarendsveen
 1979/80:  RKSV Braakhuizen
 1980/81:  RKSV Braakhuizen
 1981/82:  Puck Deventer
 1982/83:  RKTVC Tiel
 1983/84:  Groote Lindt Zwijndrecht
 1984/85:  UD Weerselo
 1985/86:  KFC '71 Delft
 1986/87:  RKSV Braakhuizen
 1987/88:  RKTVC Tiel
 1988/89:  KFC '71 Delft
 1989/90:  Rijsoord

1990–2007 
 1990/91:  Den Dungen
 1991/92:  Den Dungen
 1992/93:  Den Dungen
 1993/94:  Den Dungen
 1994/95:  Den Dungen
 1995/96:  SV Saestum
 1996/97:  SV Saestum
 1997/98:  SV Saestum
 1998/99:  SV Saestum
 1999/00:  SV Saestum
 2000/01:  Ter Leede
 2001/02:  SV Saestum
 2002/03:  Ter Leede
 2003/04:  Ter Leede
 2004/05:  SV Saestum
 2005/06:  SV Saestum
 2006/07:  Ter Leede

Since 2007 
 2007–08: SV Saestum
 2008–09: Ter Leede
 2009–10: Ter Leede
 2010–11: RCL
 2011–12: DTS Ede and RKHVV (2 divisions)
 2012–13: Wartburgia and Gelre
 2013–14: Oranje Nassau Groningen and SV Saestum II
 2014–15: BVV Barendrecht and VV AV Eindhoven

External links
Hoofdklasse at women.soccerway.com
Website about women's football, (standings, pairings,..)

References

Women's football leagues in the Netherlands